Aa Tarmana was the mayor of Bandung from 1998 to 2003.   He was the front-runner for a reelection, but overnight the second-level parliament elected Dada Rosada instead.

Tarmana was a colonel in the Indonesian Army and he was known for his military-style leadership. His time as mayor also involved him supporting street vendors with tents, in contrast with his predecessor and successor who attempted to relocate them.

References

Year of birth missing (living people)
People from Bandung
Sundanese people
Indonesian military personnel
Living people
Mayors of Bandung
Mayors of places in Indonesia